Vincent dePaul Draddy (1907 - July 8, 1990) was an American entrepreneur and former scholar-athlete at Manhattan College. He later became associated with the Izod name and brand, which he helped popularize.

Manhattan College 
While at Manhattan College, Draddy played football, basketball, and golf. 

Draddy was also a College Football Hall of Famer and former chairman of the National Football Foundation. The Vincent dePaul Draddy Trophy, now known as the William V. Campbell Trophy, is awarded annually by the National Football Foundation and is given to the American college football player with the best combination of academics, community service, and on-field performance. It is considered by many to be the "Academic Heisman". 

Draddy Gymnasium on the college's campus is named in his honor.

References

Year of birth missing
1990 deaths
Sportspeople from Manhattan
Players of American football from New York (state)
American football quarterbacks
Manhattan Jaspers football players
College Football Hall of Fame inductees